Kudaikul Mazhai is a 2004 Tamil-language drama film written, directed and produced by Parthiban. He also stars in the lead role alongside Madhumitha, while Sriman portrayed a supporting role. The film released in September 2004 and was a box office bomb

Plot 
Venkat (Parthiban) finds himself in a spot when suddenly a young, modern, good-looking Madhumita (Madhumitha) follows him everywhere, proclaiming her love for him. He knows that she's too big a catch for him and even tells her so, but when she goes on in a romantic vein, he yields to the temptation. And that spells his doom for it has been a charade all along. The shock is too much for the mild mannered Venkat. The affected, cobwebbed mind begins to develop schizophrenic tendencies.

Cast 
Parthiban as Dixon Raj
Madhumitha as Madhumitha
Sriman
Deepa Venkat

Production 
The film was originally titled Nee + Naan, though Parthiban chose to rename it Kudaikul Mazhai as the story was about his character's first love and felt that the experience metaphors an experience of rain inside an umbrella. The scenes were shot with a steady cam and 435 cameras, using sophisticated techniques, with scenes usually filmed at night. Many of the scenes were shot at a huge set erected at Pallavaram by art director R K Vijaymurugan. The film was completed with little publicity and promotion, with Parthiban noting he did not want his audience to come to the cinema halls with preconceived ideas about the film.

Soundtrack 
The music was composed by Karthik Raja. The lyrics were written by Na. Muthukumar and Parthiban.

Release and reception 
Malathi Rangarajan of The Hindu said the film "is a marked deviation from formula fare. Parthiban the creator has slogged to provide a new menu for the audience. And he has, as far as the theme goes." Sifys critic noted "within the commercial format and he has done his best to make a different film". Visual Dasan of Kalki called the film a visual poem and praised Parthiban for breaking the cliches of Tamil cinema.

The film however met with a "cold response" at the box office, with Parthiban suggesting that the film was "far ahead of its time". Madhumitha's performance in the film was well received and she was offered several Tamil films soon after the release of Kudaikul Mazhai.

References

External links 
 

2000s Tamil-language films
2004 films
Films directed by R. Parthiban
Films scored by Karthik Raja